The Pakistan-administered state of Azad Kashmir was officially established on 24 October 1947. The president is the constitutional head while the prime minister is the chief executive of the state. The president elected by the Azad Jammu and Kashmir Legislative Assembly for term of 5 years under the provisions of Azad Jammu & Kashmir (Interim Constitution) Act, 1974.

List of presidents 
The following individuals have served as president of Azad Kashmir.

See also
 Prime Minister of Azad Kashmir
 Government of Azad Kashmir
 List of Governors of Pakistan
 List of Chief Ministers in Pakistan
 List of Prime and Chief Ministers of Jammu and Kashmir

Notes

masood

External links 
 Website

Politics of Azad Kashmir
Azad Kashmir-related lists
Presidents of Azad Kashmir
Government of Azad Kashmir